Hold That Line is a 1952 comedy film starring the Bowery Boys. The film was released on March 23, 1952 by Monogram Pictures and is the 25th film in the series.

Plot
The members of the local university's trust make a wager that anyone can succeed in college if just given the chance. They enlist Slip Mahoney and his gang to prove the theory by attending the university. While the boys do not become academic scholars, Sach invents a "vitamin" drink that makes him invincible.  They all join the football team and Sach becomes the star player, leading them to the big championship game. A local gambler, seeing an opportunity to make some money, kidnaps Sach to prevent him from playing. Slip and the rest of the gang rescue Sach and return him to the game. Sach is out of "vitamins," so Slip plans a ruse on the playing field that distracts the other team and allows him to score the winning touchdown. Afterward, Sach concocts a new formula that allows him to fly.

Cast

The Bowery Boys
Leo Gorcey as Terrance Aloysius "Slip" Mahoney
Huntz Hall as Horace Debussy "Sach" Jones
David Gorcey as Chuck (Credited as David Conden)
Bennie Bartlett as Butch (Credited as David Bartlett)
Gil Stratton, Jr. as Junior

Remaining cast
Bernard Gorcey as Louie Dumbrowski and Morris Dumbrowski
John Bromfield as Biff Wallace
Taylor Holmes as Dean Forrester
Veda Ann Borg as Candy Callin
Gloria Winters as Penny Wells
Mona Knox as Katie Wayne

Production
This is the first of two appearances by Gil Stratton, Jr. as a member of the gang, replacing William Benedict. Stratton was reluctant to join the series (his agent accepted the job for the money), and he tried to keep himself as inconspicuous as possible in the films; he often gave his dialogue to Leo Gorcey or Huntz Hall.

Director William Beaudine captured the college-campus and football elements of Hold That Line so well that Monogram hired him to film a more elaborate gridiron picture, The Rose Bowl Story, that same season.

Home media
Warner Archives released the film on made-to-order DVD in the United States as part of "The Bowery Boys, Volume Two" on April 9, 2013.

References

External links

1950s sports comedy films
1952 films
American black-and-white films
American football films
Bowery Boys films
Films directed by William Beaudine
Films set in universities and colleges
Monogram Pictures films
1952 comedy films
1950s English-language films
1950s American films